This is a list of the General Top 20 songs of 2015 in Mexico according to Monitor Latino. Monitor Latino issued two year-end General charts: one which ranked the songs by their number of plays on Mexican radio, and the other ranked the songs by their estimated audience. Monitor Latino also issued separate year-end charts for Regional Mexican, Pop and Anglo songs.

See also
List of number-one songs of 2015 (Mexico)
List of number-one albums of 2015 (Mexico)

References

2015 in Mexican music
Mexico Top 20
Mexican record charts